Francisco Rodríguez (born 1906, date of death unknown) was an Argentine cyclist. He competed in the time trial event at the 1928 Summer Olympics.

References

External links
 

1906 births
Year of death missing
Argentine male cyclists
Olympic cyclists of Argentina
Cyclists at the 1928 Summer Olympics
Place of birth missing